Salem Al-Khaibari (born 6 August 1991) is a Saudi Arabian football player who currently plays as a forward for Al-Diriyah.

References

External links 
 

Living people
1991 births
Saudi Arabian footballers
Al-Faisaly FC players
Al-Orobah FC players
Al-Kholood Club players
Al-Diriyah Club players
Saudi Professional League players
Saudi First Division League players
Saudi Second Division players
Association football forwards